La place Georges-Moustaki is a street in the 5th Arrondissement of Paris.

History 
The roundabout is at the intersection of rue Censier, rue Mouffetard, rue de Bazeilles, and rue Pascal.

On May 23, 2017, la place Georges-Moustaki was officially inaugurated in honor of  Georges Moustaki. Present at the inauguration were his  daughter, as well as Anne Hidalgo, the Mayor of Paris, and Florence Berthout, the Mayor of the 5th arrondissement.

References 

Streets in the 5th arrondissement of Paris